Mendoza is a genus of jumping spiders that was first described by George and Elizabeth Peckham in 1894.

Species
 it contains nine species, found only in Africa, Asia, and Europe:
Mendoza canestrinii (Ninni, 1868) (type) – Southern Europe, North Africa to Central Asia, China, Korea, Japan, Vietnam
Mendoza dersuuzalai (Logunov & Wesolowska, 1992) – Russia
Mendoza elongata (Karsch, 1879) – Russia, China, Korea, Japan
Mendoza ibarakiensis (Bohdanowicz & Prószyński, 1987) – Japan
Mendoza nobilis (Grube, 1861) – Russia, Korea, China
Mendoza pulchra (Prószyński, 1981) – Russia, China, Korea, Japan
Mendoza ryukyuensis Baba, 2007 – Japan
Mendoza suguroi Baba, 2013 – Japan
Mendoza zebra (Logunov & Wesolowska, 1992) – Russia

References

Salticidae genera
Salticidae
Spiders of Africa
Spiders of Asia
Spiders of Russia